Manisa Futbol Kulübü, formerly Manisa Büyükşehir Belediyespor, is a Turkish professional football club based in Manisa. The club colours are black and white and they play their home matches at the Manisa 19 Mayıs Stadium.

History
Founded in 1994 as a branch of the Manisa Belediyesinin sports club, the club started to compete in the Regional Amateur League in the 2011-2012 season.

On 31 July 2019, it left Manisa Büyükşehir Belediyespor'dan and became an independent club under the name of Manisa Football Club .

The club secured the title 5 weeks before the end of 2020–21 TFF Second League Group White. As of the date of attaining the title, they enjoying an unbeaten record, consisting of 35 league games.

The team previously played its home matches at the Mümin Özkasap Stadium.

League history
TFF First League: 2021–
TFF Second League: 2018–2021
TFF Third League: 2015–18
Regional Amateur League: 2011–15
Super Amateur Leagues: 1994–2011

Honours
TFF Second League (1): 2020–21
TFF Third League (1): 2017–18

Players

Current squad

Out on loan

References

External links 
Official website
Manisa FK on TFF.org

Sport in Manisa
Football clubs in Turkey
2019 establishments in Turkey